New Albany is a city in Wilson County, Kansas, United States.  As of the 2020 census, the population of the city was 57.

History
New Albany was founded in 1866. It was named after New Albany, Indiana.

The first post office in New Albany was established in May 1866.

Geography
New Albany is located at  (37.567805, -95.939453).

Demographics

2010 census
As of the census of 2010, there were 56 people, 23 households, and 17 families residing in the city. The racial makeup of the city was 96.4% White and 3.6% from two or more races. Hispanic or Latino of any race were 7.1% of the population.

There were 23 households, of which 30.4% had children under the age of 18 living with them, 73.9% were married couples living together, and 26.1% were non-families. 26.1% of all households were made up of individuals, and 13% had someone living alone who was 65 years of age or older. The average household size was 2.43 and the average family size was 2.94.

The median age in the city was 46.5 years. 23.2% of residents were under the age of 18; 1.8% were between the ages of 18 and 24; 21.4% were from 25 to 44; 32.2% were from 45 to 64; and 21.4% were 65 years of age or older. The gender makeup of the city was 55.4% male and 44.6% female.

2000 census
As of the census of 2000, there were 73 people, 30 households, and 23 families residing in the city. The racial makeup of the city was 94.52% White, 4.11% Native American, and 1.37% from two or more races. Hispanic or Latino of any race were 1.37% of the population.

There were 30 households, out of which 23.3% had children under the age of 18 living with them, 70.0% were married couples living together, 6.7% had a female householder with no husband present, and 23.3% were non-families. 20.0% of all households were made up of individuals, and 10.0% had someone living alone who was 65 years of age or older. The average household size was 2.43 and the average family size was 2.74.

In the city, the population was spread out, with 17.8% under the age of 18, 6.8% from 18 to 24, 17.8% from 25 to 44, 38.4% from 45 to 64, and 19.2% who were 65 years of age or older. The median age was 48 years. For every 100 females, there were 102.8 males. For every 100 females age 18 and over, there were 87.5 males.

The median income for a household in the city was $23,125, and the median income for a family was $27,500. Males had a median income of $18,125 versus $12,188 for females. The per capita income for the city was $8,622. There were 16.7% of families and 25.0% of the population living below the poverty line, including 53.8% of under eighteens and none of those over 64.

References

Further reading

External links
 New Albany - Directory of Public Officials
 USD 484, local school district
 New Albany city map, KDOT

Cities in Kansas
Cities in Wilson County, Kansas